Aspergillus egyptiacus is a species of fungus in the genus Aspergillus. It is from the Cavernicolus section. The species was first described in 1972. It was isolated from sandy soil in Egypt.

Growth and morphology

A. egyptiacus has been cultivated on both Czapek yeast extract agar (CYA) plates and Malt Extract Agar Oxoid® (MEAOX) plates. The growth morphology of the colonies can be seen in the pictures below.

References

Further reading
 
 
 
 

egyptiacus
Fungi described in 1972